James Patrick Mahoney (August 16, 1925 – June 1, 2002) was a bishop of the Catholic Church in the United States . He served as an auxiliary bishop of the Archdiocese of New York from 1972 to 1997.

Biography
Born in Kingston, New York, James Mahoney was ordained a priest for the Archdiocese of New York on May 19, 1951.

Pope Paul VI appointed him as the Titular Bishop of Ipagro and Auxiliary Bishop of New York on July 25, 1972.  He was consecrated bishop by Cardinal Terence Cooke on September 15, 1972. The principal co-consecrators were Coadjutor Archbishop John Maguire of New York and Auxiliary Bishop Patrick Ahern.

Mahoney continued to serve as an auxiliary bishop until his resignation was accepted by Pope John Paul II on May 10, 1997.

Mahoney died on June 1, 2002, at the age of 76.

References

1925 births
2002 deaths
People from Kingston, New York
20th-century American Roman Catholic titular bishops
Catholics from New York (state)